William Mallory Levy (October 31, 1827 – August 14, 1882) was a U.S. Representative from Louisiana.

Life and career
Born in Isle of Wight, Virginia, the son of John B. Levy, Levy completed preparatory studies.
He graduated from the College of William and Mary, Williamsburg, Virginia, in 1844.
He served in the Mexican War, as second lieutenant in Company F, First Regiment, Virginia Volunteers.
He studied law.
He was admitted to the bar in 1851 and commenced practice in Norfolk, Virginia.
He moved to Natchitoches, Louisiana, in 1852 and continued the practice of law.
He served as member of the State house of representatives 1859–1861.
He was a Democratic Presidential Elector, 1860.
He served in the Confederate States Army during the Civil War.
Commissioned captain of Company A, Second Louisiana Infantry, May 11, 1861.
He subsequently served as a major in the Adjutant General's Department.

Levy was elected as a Democrat to the Forty-fourth Congress (March 4, 1875 – March 3, 1877).
He was an unsuccessful candidate for renomination in 1876.
He served as member of the State constitutional convention in 1879.
He was appointed associate justice of the State supreme court in 1879 and served until his death in Saratoga, New York on August 14, 1882.
His funeral was in the Protestant Episcopal Church in Natchitoches, Louisiana, and he was interred in the American Cemetery there.

See also
List of Jewish members of the United States Congress

References

External links

1827 births
1882 deaths
Justices of the Louisiana Supreme Court
College of William & Mary alumni
United States Army officers
Confederate States Army officers
American military personnel of the Mexican–American War
Democratic Party members of the Louisiana House of Representatives
Democratic Party members of the United States House of Representatives from Louisiana
19th-century American politicians
People from Isle of Wight County, Virginia
Jewish Confederates